Impact (formerly Impact Asia), styled also as Impact with Yalda Hakim is a news programme that premiered on BBC World News on 1 February 2010 as part of a network-wide refresh. The programme is hosted by Yalda Hakim, who replaced previous presenter Mishal Husain. The programme brings audiences a mixture of breaking news, debate and analysis using the BBC's range of correspondents based in the Asia Pacific regions and around the world. Broadcasting political, diplomatic, business, sports and breaking news stories directly affecting Asia Pacific, the programme aims to analyse stories from a global perspective. The format includes sport, business and weather updates.

History
As part of a shake-up of the BBC World News schedule, on 1 February 2010 presenter based strands were developed to give more focus on the names hosting each slot. These replaced several editions of World News Today. Impact Asia was developed as one of these slots. In 2011 the programme was renamed Impact to avoid the exclusion of other sections of the global audience.

Schedule
Impact is currently aired from 13:00–14:30 GMT (with an extra half-hour at 15:00 GMT), weekdays on BBC World News. The programme is split into three parts, each lasting half an hour. After the final section World Business Report then Sport Today air. During British Summer Time, the programme airs at 12:00–13:30 GMT (with an extra half-hour at 14:00 GMT); and is followed by an edition of HARDtalk.

Presentation
The programme was originally broadcast from studio N8 in the News Centre at BBC Television Centre, along with other output from BBC World News. When major news events occur the programme may be presented on location, for example, Mishal Husain presented from Pakistan in the aftermath of Osama Bin Laden's death. From 14 January 2013 the programme moved to Broadcasting House studio B.

Presenters

When Yalda Hakim presents, the title sequence ends by stating 'Impact with Yalda Hakim'. However, when she does not, as she is often on assignment, the titles only show 'Impact', regardless of the alternate presenter. This only happens if she isn't reporting from a location on a topic covered in the show.

It was announced that Husain would leave the show in autumn 2013 to join Today, she presented her last programme on 7 October 2013. She is to maintain the role of 'relief presenter'. In April 2014, Yalda Hakim was announced as Husain's permanent replacement.

References

External links
 (Current)
 (2010–2012)

2020s British television series
2010 British television series debuts
BBC World News shows